Body Language is a 1990 play by British playwright Alan Ayckbourn. It is about two women, one thin and one fat, who have their bodies swapped as a result of a botched operation.

References
 Body Language on official Ayckbourn site
 Allen, Paul (2004) A Pocket Guide to Alan Ayckbourn Plays Faber & Faber 
 

Plays by Alan Ayckbourn
1990 plays